Villa Ballester is a city  located in the northern Greater Buenos Aires urban area and it is part of the General San Martín Partido in Buenos Aires Province, Argentina.  It is served by the Línea Mitre commuter railway with its station also named Villa Ballester. Founded on 26 October 1889.

History

Pedro Ballester (4 December 1849 – 5 September 1928) started the development of the town in the late 1880s in some fields occupied by his family, the chacra Miguel Ballester y Flotat. A key factor for the success of the new town was the train which provided fast access to Buenos Aires. The town was named after the commercial partnership between Pedro Ballester and Guillermo Lacroze, "Sociedad Villa Ballester".

Education
Hölters Schule, a German school, is in Villa Ballester. It was once recognized as a German school by the West German government.

Sports
The city received international attention as one of the host cities of the 1990 FIBA World Championship.

Notable residents
 Juliana Awada (born 1974), First Lady of Argentina
 Alejandro Awada (born 1961), actor
  Ceferino Carnacini (1888–1964), painter
 Annemarie Heinrich (1912–2005), German-born photographer
 Carlos Ripamonte (1874–1968), painter
 Fernando Siro (1931–2006), film actor, film director and screenwriter
 Helmut Ditsch (born 1962), painter
 José Carreras (born 1946), Spanish tenor, lived in Villa Ballester for a year during his childhood
 José Hernández (1834–1886), journalist and poet, born at the Pueyrredón Chacra on 10 November 1834
 Luis César Amadori (1920–1977), film director, married to Zully Moreno
 Roberto De Vicenzo (1923-2017), former professional golfer and The Open Championship winner
Beatriz Zavatarelli de Gamba (b.1926), author and poet

References

External links

 Villa Ballester Portal

Populated places established in 1889
General San Martín Partido
Populated places in Buenos Aires Province